Kashmir mainly refers to the northwestern region of the Indian subcontinent claimed by China, India, and Pakistan.

Kashmir region 
 Kashmir Valley, the largest valley in Jammu and Kashmir
 Kashmir Division, is a revenue and administrative division containing the Kashmir Valley region of Jammu and Kashmir.
 Jammu and Kashmir (princely state), former princely state in British India from 1846 to 1952.
 Jammu and Kashmir (state), former state in India from 1952 to 2019, divided into two union territories in 2019.
 Jammu and Kashmir (union territory), a union territory in India after 2019, part of Indian-administered Kashmir
 Ladakh, a union territory in India after 2019, part of Indian-administered Kashmir
 Azad Kashmir, a nominally self-governing province in Pakistan, part of Pakistani-administered Kashmir
 Gilgit-Baltistan, an administrative territory in Pakistan, part of Pakistani-administered Kashmir
 Aksai Chin, a region in China, part of the wider Kashmir region
 Trans-Karakoram Tract, a tract in China, part of the wider Kashmir region

Other places 
 Kashmir, Iran, a village in Hormozgan province, Iran (not to be confused with Kashmar, a city in Razavi Khorasan Province)

Music 
 Kshmr, born Niles Hollowell-Dhar, a Kashmiri DJ and record producer (formerly of The Cataracs)
 Kashmir (Danish band), rock band from Denmark
 Kashmir (Pakistani band), rock band from Karachi, Pakistan
 "Kashmir" (song), 1975 song by rock band Led Zeppelin 
 Kashmir: Symphonic Led Zeppelin, tribute album to Led Zeppelin
 "Kashmir", instrumental track by Scooter from Back to the Heavyweight Jam

Other uses
 Kashmir (horse), a thoroughbred racehorse
 HMS Kashmir (F12), World War 2, Royal Navy destroyer

See also 
 Cashmere (disambiguation)
 Cashmere goat, a breed of goat
 Cashmere wool, a type of goat fiber
 Casimir, a male name
 Kashmiri (disambiguation)
 Kashmore (disambiguation)